Storjuvtinden is a mountain in Lom Municipality in Innlandet county, Norway. The peak is on the massif between the valleys Leirdalen and Visdalen. The mountain is surrounded by several other notable mountains including Galdhøpiggen and Keilhaus topp to the northeast; Svellnosbreahesten, Midtre Tverråtinden, and Store Tverråtinden to the southeast; Bukkehøe to the southwest; Skardstinden to the west; Storgrovtinden and Storgrovhøe to the northwest; and Veslpiggen to the north.

The mountain can be accessed from Geitsætri in Leirdalen without a glacier crossing. It is Norway's 12th highest mountain, with respect to a Topographic prominence of at least .

Name
The first element is the name of the Storjuvet gorge. The last element is the finite form of tind which means 'mountain peak'. The name of the gorge is a compound of stor which means 'big' and juv which means 'gorge' or 'canyon'. The gorge is also the source of the name of the glacier Storjuvbrean in the bottom of the gorge.

See also
List of mountains of Norway by height

References

Jotunheimen
Lom, Norway
Mountains of Innlandet